Ryan Michael McClean Cassidy (born 2 March 2001) is an Irish professional footballer who plays as a striker for Hayes & Yeading United.

Club career
Born in Dublin, Cassidy moved from St. Kevin's Boys to Watford in July 2017, and turned professional in 2018. 

After signing a new two-year contract with Watford in July 2020, he moved on loan to Accrington Stanley in August 2020. He scored his first goals for Accrington when he scored twice in an EFL Trophy tie against Leeds United U21s on 8 September 2020.

He signed for League of Ireland Premier Division side Bohemians on loan in January 2022.

He left Watford in June 2022 after the expiry of his contract. In February 2023, he joined Southern League Premier Division South club Hayes & Yeading United.

International career
Cassidy has represented Republic of Ireland at under-17, under-18 and under-19 youth levels. He received his first official call up to the under-21 squad on 11 November 2020, in place of the injured Jonathan Afolabi.

Career statistics

References

2001 births
Living people
Republic of Ireland association footballers
Republic of Ireland youth international footballers
Association football forwards
St. Kevin's Boys F.C. players
Watford F.C. players
Accrington Stanley F.C. players
Bohemian F.C. players
Hayes & Yeading United F.C. players
English Football League players
League of Ireland players
Republic of Ireland expatriate association footballers
Irish expatriate sportspeople in England
Expatriate footballers in England